Rowena A. Morrill (September 14, 1944 – February 11, 2021), also credited as Rowena and Rowina Morril, was an American artist known for her science-fiction and fantasy illustration, and is credited as one of the first female artists to impact paperback cover illustration. Her notable artist monographs included The Fantastic Art of Rowena, Imagine (in France), Imagination (in Germany), and The Art of Rowena and her work has also been included in a variety of anthologies including Tomorrow and Beyond and Infinite Worlds.

Career
Morrill received a BA from the University of Delaware in 1971 and then studied at the Tyler School of Arts in Philadelphia. After dropping out of the Tyler program, she worked for an advertising agency in New York City. She showed her portfolio to Charles Volpe at Ace Books, and was commissioned by Volpe to illustrate a romance cover. Morrill's first design for a horror novel was Jane Parkhurst's Isobel (1977).

Morrill continued to work in horror, producing cover art for H. P. Lovecraft collections before turning her attention to science fiction and fantasy. To create these illustrations, Morrill used oil on illustration board, coating the image with a high-gloss glaze and thin coats of paint.

Morrill created a number covers for books by such authors as Anne McCaffrey, Philip K. Dick, Isaac Asimov, Samuel R. Delany, Theodore Sturgeon, Piers Anthony and Madeleine L'Engle. As well, her paintings have appeared on hundreds of calendars, portfolios and in magazines such as Playboy, Heavy Metal, Omni, Art Scene International, and Print Magazine.

She was nominated for the Hugo Award four times in the Best Artist category. In 1983, her book The Fantastic Art of Rowena was nominated for the Hugo Award for Best Nonfiction Book, and the Locus Award for Nonfiction/Reference. In 1984, she received the British Fantasy Award. She was named Artist Guest of Honor for Chicon 7, the 70th World Science Fiction Convention, held in 2012. She was named Guest of Honor at the 2017 World Fantasy Convention held in San Antonio, TX. She received a World Fantasy Life Achievement Award at the 2020 convention.

Following the fall of Saddam Hussein in Iraq, art which appeared to be Morrill's original paintings King Dragon and Shadows Out of Hell were discovered hanging in one of his houses. According to Morrill, they were copies, as she had sold the originals to a Japanese collector.

Morrill died in February 2021, at the age of 76, after a long illness.

Alleged plagiarism of Morrill's work

In 2003, a Flash animation slideshow titled "Family Art Corner" was released anonymously, alleging that a woman named Jan "Tamar" McRae had plagiarized the work of many artists, including Morrill, for reproduction in proselytization tracts printed by the Children of God cult. After the slideshow was released, both McRae and Karen Zerby, leader of the Children of God, acknowledged that McRae had copied the work of others, and McRae admitted wrongdoing.

Notes

References

Further reading
 Robert Weinberg. "Rowena Morrill". World Fantasy 1983: Sixty Years of Weird Tales (convention program book), pp. 9–10.

External links
 
 

1944 births
2021 deaths
American women illustrators
Artists from Mississippi
Fantasy artists
Role-playing game artists
Science fiction artists
University of Delaware alumni
Inkpot Award winners
Place of birth missing
Place of death missing
21st-century American women